Schlenker is a surname German origin and may refer to:

 Chris Schlenker (born 1984), Canadian ice hockey referee
 Georg Schlenker German World War I fighter pilot
 Hans Schlenker German pianist
 Ines Schlenker German art historian
 Lisa Schlenker (born 1964), American rower
 Vincent Schlenker (born 1992), German hockey player

Surnames from nicknames